Domingo Torralva (born 7 February 1900, date of death unknown) was a Chilean tennis player. He competed in the men's singles and doubles events at the 1924 Summer Olympics.

References

External links
 

1900 births
Year of death missing
Chilean male tennis players
Olympic tennis players of Chile
Tennis players at the 1924 Summer Olympics
Tennis players from Santiago